The 1988–89 Courage Area League South was the second full season of rugby union within the fourth tier of the English league system, currently known as National League 2 South, and counterpart to Courage Area League North (now known as National League 2 North).  Lydney won the championship despite having an identical win/draw/lose record to Havant in second place, and finished top due to a superior points difference, gaining promotion to the 1989–90 National Division Three. Three teams were relegated; Ealing (to London Division 1), Stroud (to South West Division 1) and Sidcup (to London Division 1). Last season Sidcup finished second, and this season lost all ten matches.

Structure
Each team played one match against each of the other teams, playing a total of ten matches each. This was the first season of fixed Saturdays for league matches. The champions are promoted to National Division 3 and the last three teams are relegated to either London 1 or South West 1 depending on their locality.

Participating teams and locations

League table

Sponsorship
Area League South is part of the Courage Clubs Championship and is sponsored by Courage Brewery.

References

N4
National League 2 South